Quest for Bush is a free first-person shooter video game released by the Global Islamic Media Front (an al-Qaeda propaganda organization) in September 2006. The goal is to fight soldiers through six levels and eventually to kill the boss, George W. Bush. The game is a modification of Quest for Saddam, released by Petrilla Entertainment in 2003. However, the title screen calls it Night of Bush Capturing.

References

External links

 Quest for Bush / Quest for Saddam: Content vs. Context - 2006-09-26 review from Gameology.org
 Further screenshots of the game and comparison of the source files with the original - 2009-12-23 (German)

2006 video games
First-person shooters
Propaganda video games
Torque (game engine) games
Windows games
Windows-only games
Cultural depictions of George W. Bush
Al-Qaeda propaganda
Video games based on real people
Single-player video games